Music Minus One (MMO) is a music production and recording company in Westchester, New York. Their recordings are meant to be accompanied by the listener on whichever instrument (or voice type) is excluded from the recording, as an aid to practice, or as an accompaniment to home performance. The technique is the same as the later development of karaoke for the voice. More to the point, the recordings have two versions; first, the entire piece is played, including the soloist, and then the MMO version omits the solo player. Hence this track is now the accompaniment, whether a small Classical Music ensemble or a Jazz Band. Watching the score and/or playing along with the full music, the student can learn about every aspect of the performance, such as the timing and expressiveness of the soloist's performance. After such study and practice, the student can then play along with the accompaniment.

Background
Music Minus One was founded in 1950 by Irv Kratka, a 24-year-old college student. The company's first recording was devoted to Schubert's Trout Quintet, with all five instruments omitted in five different MMO's. This release received a full page review in 1953 in The New York Times. As a result, articles appeared in Look, Life, Time, Newsweek, and hundreds of papers across the United States and Europe.

In the following years, the company continued to release chamber music and jazz rhythm recordings utilizing the best of New York's players at the time, many of whom are legends in music. Such names as Stan Getz, Hank Jones, George Barnes, Max Roach, Sam Baron, Julius Baker, Murray Panitz, Doriot Dwyer, Elaine Douvas, Donald Peck, Armando Ghitalla, Stanley Drucker, Christian Reichert and countless other first chair players in the five major American orchestras were prevailed upon to add their skills to MMO recordings.

Today, MMO offers close to nine hundred albums, devoted to classical, chamber music, opera, lieder, popular, jazz and religious music from all times and periods, from the Baroque, through the Classical and Romantic periods in music.

Sale to Hal Leonard
In 2016, the CEO of the Hal Leonard Corporation, Keith Mardak, closed a deal with Irv Kratka to buy Music Minus One.

References

External links

 UK Distributors of Music Minus One
 NAMM Oral History Interview Irv Kratka reflects on the development of Music Minus One and the musicians on the recordings, September 13, 2005
 New York Times "Records: Play Along" Sept 13, 1953 review of MMO Trout Quintet recording.

American record labels
Record labels established in 1950
Sheet music publishing companies
Companies based in Westchester County, New York